"Paint It Black" is a song recorded in 1966 by the English rock band the Rolling Stones. A product of the songwriting partnership of Mick Jagger and Keith Richards, it is a raga rock song with Indian, Middle Eastern, and Eastern European influences and lyrics about grief and loss. London Records released the song as a single on 7 May 1966 in the United States, and Decca Records released it on 13 May in the United Kingdom. Two months later, London Records included it as the opening track on the American version of the band's 1966 studio album Aftermath, though it is not on the original UK release. 

Originating from a series of improvisational melodies played by Brian Jones on the sitar, all five members of the band contributed to the final arrangement, although only Jagger and Richards were credited as songwriters. In contrast to previous Rolling Stones singles with straightforward rock arrangements, "Paint It Black" has unconventional instrumentation including a prominent sitar, the Hammond organ, and castanets. This instrumental experimentation matches other songs on Aftermath. The song was influential to the burgeoning psychedelic genre as the first chart-topping single to feature the sitar, and widened the instrument's audience. Reviews of the song at the time were mixed and some music critics believed its use of the sitar was an attempt to copy the Beatles, and others criticized its experimental style and doubted its commercial potential. 

"Paint It Black" was a major chart success for the Rolling Stones, at eleven weeks (including two at number one) on the US Billboard Hot 100, and 10 weeks (including one atop the chart) on the Record Retailer chart in the UK. Upon a re-issue in 2007, it reentered the UK Singles Chart for 11 weeks. It was the band's third number-one single in the US and sixth in the UK. The song also topped charts in Canada and the Netherlands. It received a platinum certification in the UK from the British Phonographic Industry (BPI) and from Italy's Federazione Industria Musicale Italiana (FIMI).

"Paint It Black" was inducted into the Grammy Hall of Fame in 2018, and Rolling Stone magazine ranked the song number 213 on their list of the 500 Greatest Songs of All Time. In 2011, the song was added to the Rock and Roll Hall of Fame's list of "The Songs that Shaped Rock and Roll". Many artists have covered "Paint It Black" since its initial release. It has been included on many of the band's compilation albums, and several film soundtracks. It was played on several Rolling Stones tours.

Background
In 1965, popularity of the Rolling Stones increased markedly with a series of international hit singles written by lead singer Mick Jagger and guitarist Keith Richards. While 1964 saw the band reach the top of both the albums and singles charts in their native United Kingdom, other bands from Britain dominated the American market, such as the Beatles. In 1965, the Stones crossed over to the American Market with their first number one single, "(I Can't Get No) Satisfaction", and first number one album Out of Our Heads. That year also saw the Stones reach the top of the charts for the first time in countries such as Finland, Germany, and South Africa.

This success attracted the attention of Allen Klein, an American businessman who became their US representative in August while Andrew Loog Oldham, the group's manager, continued in the role of promoter and record producer. One of Klein's first actions on the band's behalf was to force Decca Records to grant a $1.2 million royalty advance to the group, bringing the members their first signs of financial wealth and allowing them to purchase country houses and new cars. Their October–December 1965 tour of North America was the group's fourth and largest tour there up to that point. According to the biographer Victor Bockris, through Klein's involvement, the concerts afforded the band "more publicity, more protection and higher fees than ever before".

By this time, the Rolling Stones had begun to respond to the increasingly sophisticated music of the Beatles, in comparison to whom they had long been promoted by Oldham as a rougher alternative. With the success of the Jagger-Richards-penned singles "(I Can't Get No) Satisfaction" (1965), "Get Off of My Cloud" (1965) and "19th Nervous Breakdown" (1966), the band increasingly rivalled the musical and cultural influence of the Beatles, and began to be identified as one of the major pillars of the British Invasion. The Stones' outspoken, surly attitude on songs like "Satisfaction" alienated the Establishment detractors of rock music, which music historian Colin King explains, "only made the group more appealing to those sons and daughters who found themselves estranged from the hypocrisies of the adult world – an element that would solidify into an increasingly militant and disenchanted counterculture as the decade wore on".

Development 
"Paint It Black" came at a pivotal period in the band's recording history. The Jagger/Richards songwriting collaboration had begun producing more original material for the band over the past year, with the early model of Stones albums featuring only a few Jagger-Richards compositions having been replaced by that of albums such as Out of Our Heads and December's Children (and Everybody's), each of which consisted of half original tracks and half cover songs. This trend culminated in the sessions for Aftermath (1966) where, for the first time, the duo penned every track on the album. Brian Jones, originally the band's founder and leader over the first few years of its existence, began feeling overshadowed by the prominence of Jagger and Richards' contributions to the group. 

Despite having contributed to early songs by the Stones via the Nanker Phelge pseudonym, Jones had less and less influence over the group's direction as their popularity grew primarily as a result of original Jagger-Richards singles. Jones grew bored attempting to write songs, and with conventional guitar melodies. To alleviate his boredom, he begun exploring Eastern instruments, specifically the Indian sitar, with a goal to bolstering the musical texture and complexity of the band's sound. A multi-instrumentalist, Jones could develop a tune on the sitar in a short time; he had a background with the instrument largely from his studies under Harihar Rao, a disciple of Ravi Shankar. 

Over 1965, the sitar had become a more and more prominent instrument in the landscape of british rock. The Yardbirds had attempted to record "Heart Full of Soul" with the sitar as part of the arrangement in April, however they had run into problems getting the instrument to "cut through" the mix, and the session musician responsible for playing the instrument had trouble staying within the 4/4 time signature of the song. Ultimately, the final version of "Heart Full of Soul" featured a fuzz guitar in place of the sitar, although the song's distinctively Indian timbre remained. Following similar Indian-influenced experimentation by the Kinks on "See My Friends" that nonetheless still used guitar as the primary instrument, the first British band to release a recording featuring the sitar was the Beatles, with "Norwegian Wood (This Bird Has Flown)" released that December on the album Rubber Soul. Following a discussion with the Beatles' lead guitarist George Harrison, who had recently played the sitar on the sessions for "Norwegian Wood" in October 1965, Jones began devoting more time to the sitar, and began arranging basic melodies with the instrument. One of these melodies morphed over time into the tune featured in "Paint It Black".

Writing and recording 
Jagger and Richards wrote the lyrics and much of the chord progression of "Paint It Black" during the first group of sessions for the then untitled Aftermath the previous December, and while on the 1966 Australian tour. Initially, the first group of sessions were to be released as an album by themselves, then titled Could You Walk on the Water? In mid-January 1966, the British press announced that a new Rolling Stones LP carrying that title would be released on 10 March. In Rolling with the Stones, Wyman refers to the announcement as "audacity" on Oldham's part. A Decca spokesman said the company would not issue an album with such a title "at any price"; Oldham's idea upset executives at the company's American distributor, London Records, who feared the allusion to Jesus walking on water would provoke a negative response from Christians.

The title controversy embroiled the Stones in a conflict with Decca, delaying the Stones' next studio album's release from March to April 1966. The delay, however, gave the Stones more time to record new material for the upcoming album, which had now been retitled Aftermath. Upon their return from Australasia, it was one of the new songs worked on for the revised new album. "Paint It Black" was recorded as the Stones had begun to take more time recording their material. Referring to the atmosphere of the Stones' sessions at the time, Richards told Beat Instrumental magazine in February 1966: "Our previous sessions have always been rush jobs. This time we were able to relax a little, take our time." Sound engineer Dave Hassinger recorded the song on 6 and 9 March 1966 at RCA Studios in Los Angeles. Andrew Loog Oldham produced the track, as with all of the Stones' recordings until 1967. Both the single's US and UK B-sides were also recorded on these dates, as were a majority of album tracks for Aftermath.

"Paint It Black" follows a simple verse form that lacks a refrain. It starts with five consecutive 16-bar verses before relaxing into a chanted section and finishing in a frantic coda. The song was written originally as a standard pop arrangement in a minor key similar to "The House of the Rising Sun", which Jagger humorously compared to "songs for Jewish weddings". The Stones were dissatisfied with this version and considered scrapping the song altogether. During a session break, Bill Wyman twiddled with a Hammond organ in search of a heavier bass sound; Wyman's playing inspired the uptempo and Eastern pentatonic melody. The sitar was brought into the mix when Harihar Rao walked into the studio with one in hand. With the sitar, Jones combined his recent melodic improvisations with the chord progression and lyrics provided by Jagger and Richards. Soon after the recording session, Richards felt the track's conclusion was over-recorded and that it could have been improved.

Wyman was later critical of Oldham listing Jagger and Richards as songwriters to the exclusion of the rest of the Stones. He felt "Paint It Black" should have been credited to the band's pseudonym, Nanker Phelge, rather than Jagger–Richards, since the song's final arrangement originated from a studio improvisation by Jones, Watts and himself, and Jones was responsible for providing the melody line on the sitar. In the view of pop historian Andrew Grant Jackson, "Paint It Black" bears a strong resemblance to the Supremes' 1965 hit "My World Is Empty Without You", which used "a foreboding minor key with harpsichord and organ".

Music and lyrics 

In a 1995 interview, commenting on the musical styles found on Aftermath, Jagger described "Paint It Black" as "this kind of Turkish song". According to music scholar James E. Perone, although the introductory sitar passage is played in an Indian fashion, "the rhythmic and melodic feel of the Eastern-sounding phrases actually call to mind the Middle East more than India". Jagger's droning and slightly nasal singing complement the motif Jones plays on the sitar. Wyman's heavy bass, Charlie Watts' low-pitch drumming and Richards' bolero-driven acoustic guitar outro drive "Paint It Black". Commentators and reviewers have classified "Paint It Black" as raga rock, psychedelia, and psychedelic rock. Perone named "Paint It Black" as one of the Stones' 1966 songs that acts an explicit attempt to transcend the blues-based rock and roll conventions of the Stones' previous songs, along with other Aftermath songs such as "Stupid Girl", "Lady Jane", and "Under My Thumb".

Using colour-based metaphors, the song's lyrics describe the grief suffered by someone stunned by the sudden and unexpected loss of a partner, leading to what author Tony Visconti terms "a blanket worldview of desperation and desolation, with no hint of hope." The lyrics have also given rise to alternative interpretations scholars consider less likely, ranging from a bad trip on hallucinogens to the Vietnam War. Perone noted in 2012 that the lyrical content – a character "so entrenched in his depression and rage that he has lost all hope" – establishes a rough concept for Aftermaths American edition, the following songs offering insight into "the darkness of his psyche" and possible reasons for its darkness. Perone argues the resulting connections among the songs on Aftermath lend it a conceptual unity which, although not sufficient for it to be considered a concept album, allows for the record to be understood "as a psychodrama around the theme of love, desire and obsession that never quite turns out right". As Perone explains:The individual songs seem to ping-pong back and forth between themes of love/desire for women and the desire to control women and out-and-out misogyny. However, the band uses musical connections between songs as well as the subtheme of travel, the use of feline metaphors for women and other lyrical connections to suggest that the characters whom lead singer Mick Jagger portrays throughout the album are really one and perhaps stem from the deep recesses of his psyche.The Village Voice music critic Robert Christgau described "Paint It Black" as an example of the Stones development as artists. According to Christgau, the texture of the Stones' blues-derived hard rock is "permanently enriched" as Jones "daub[s] on occult instrumental [colours]". Christgau praised Mick Jagger specifically for his influence on the Stones' artistic identity on their 1966 material, describing him as lyricist "whose power, subtlety and wit are unparalleled in contemporary popular music", and additionally suggested that Jagger and Richards rank second as composers of melody in rock, behind only John Lennon and Paul McCartney.

Release 
London Records released "Paint It Black" as a single in the US on 7 May 1966; Decca Records released it on 13 May in the UK. "Paint It Black"s UK B-side was "Long, Long While", a song that was not released on any of the band's studio albums. Richie Unterberger of AllMusic later described "Long, Long While" as an underappreciated song, with a "considerably different" tone than most of the band's work, and commented that it was better than many of the tracks the Stones selected for their studio albums. Upon its original release, the song was credited to "Jagger-Richard", as Andrew Loog Oldham advised Keith Richards to use the surname Richard professionally on the Stones releases during the 1960s. Later releases of the song have changed the credit to "Jagger-Richards".

In the US, "Stupid Girl" was chosen as its US B-side. Both songs were included in the American release of Aftermath, with "Paint It Black" being a new addition when compared to the earlier british edition "Paint It Black" became Aftermaths opening track, replacing "Mother's Little Helper", while "Stupid Girl" remained as the second track on the album. Its delayed North American release allowed pirate radio stations to play the single up to two weeks before the album appeared. The song was originally released as "Paint It, Black", the comma being an error by Decca, which stirred controversy over its racial interpretation. The Stones performed "Paint It Black" live on The Ed Sullivan Show on 11 September.

Due to "Paint It Black" not appearing on the UK edition of Aftermath and being released as a non-album single, its first album release in the UK came on the UK edition of the compilation Big Hits (High Tide and Green Grass) (1966), however the album was not released with the song as part of its track listing in the US. The first release of the song on a compilation album in the US came on Through the Past, Darkly (Big Hits Vol. 2) (1969),

Later compilations by the Rolling Stones featuring "Paint It Black" include Hot Rocks 1964–1971 (1971), Singles Collection: The London Years (1989), Forty Licks (2002), and GRRR! (2012). Live recordings are on the concert albums Flashpoint (1991), Live Licks (2004), Shine a Light (2008), Hyde Park Live (2013), and Havana Moon (2016).

Critical reception and legacy 
Initial reaction to "Paint It Black" was mixed. Some music critics found the addition of the sitar to be simply a case of the band copying the Beatles. In his book Brian Jones: The Making of the Rolling Stones, Paul Trynka comments on the influence of Harrison's sitar playing on the Beatles' song "Norwegian Wood" from the Rubber Soul album and draws parallels with Jones' droning sitar melody on "Paint It Black". Responding to claims that he was imitating the Beatles, Jones replied: "What utter rubbish", comparing the argument to saying that all groups using a guitar copy each other merely by using the instrument. Jonathan Bellman, an American musicologist, agreed with Jones, writing in a 1997 issue of The Journal of Musicology that the events are an example of concurrent musical and instrumental experimentation. Jones' sitar part on the track influenced the development of a whole subgenre of minor-key psychedelic music.

Lindy Shannon of the La Crosse Tribune felt "Paint It Black", the Byrds' "Eight Miles High" and the Beatles' "Rain" were straying from the "commercial field" and instead "going into a sort of distorted area of unpleasant sounds". Staff at Melody Maker lauded the track, calling it "a glorious Indian raga-riot that will send the Stones back to number one". Writing for Disc and Music Echo, Penny Valentine praised Jagger's singing, writing that it was "better than ever" but was critical of the track's sitar. Guitar Players Jesse Gress cited "Paint It Black" as originating the 1960s ragarock craze. In a review for New Musical Express (NME), Keith Altham considered "Paint It Black" the band's best single since "(I Can't Get No) Satisfaction" was released the previous year. A reviewer for Billboard predicted that Aftermath would become another hit for the band, citing "Paint It Black" as the focal point of this hard rock album and praising Oldham's production. The Herald News considered the song a "top record... for teeners", and in The Sunday Press Nancy Brown described it as a "pulsating, blues-soaked romantic tear-jerker". In the San Francisco Examiner, Ralph J. Gleason lauded the song for its "hypnotizing tone" and "same qualities of ambiguity and obscurity as some of the previous Stones hits". In April 1967, while hosting the television documentary Inside Pop: The Rock Revolution, Leonard Bernstein praised the song for its "arab café" sound, and cited it as an example of contemporary pop music's ability to evoke disparate moods through instrumentation.

In a retrospective review, Richie Unterberger of AllMusic called the song an "eerily insistent" classic that features some of "the best use of sitar on a rock record", and in another AllMusic review wrote it is "perhaps the most effective use of the Indian instrument in a rock song". Writing on the song's 50th anniversary in 2016, Dave Swanson of Ultimate Classic Rock considered the song, like its parent album Aftermath, to be a major turning point in artistic evolution for the band, noting: "Paint It, Black' wasn't just another song by just another rock group; it was an explosion of ideas presented in one neat three-minute package." In 2017, ranking Aftermath as one of the best albums of the 1960s, Judy Berman of Pitchfork described the song as "rock's most nihilistic hit to date". David Palmer, editor of the Cullman Times, wrote that the "attitude" songs on Aftermath – particularly "Paint It Black" – influenced the nihilistic outlook of punk music. Stereogum critic Tom Breihan praised the song as a strong example of the band's brand of "swirling doom-blues", and praised its heavy sound and dark lyrics as ahead of its time when compared to the landscape of popular music in 1966.

"Paint It Black" inspired almost four hundred covers. It has placed on many "best songs" lists including those by Rolling Stone, Vulture magazine, NME, and Pitchfork. The Recording Academy inducted the song into the Grammy Hall of Fame in 2018. It is ranked number 213 on Rolling Stones list of the 500 Greatest Songs of All Time, and according to Acclaimed Music it is the 115th most celebrated song in popular music history.

Commercial performance
In the UK, "Paint It Black" peaked at number one on the Record Retailer chart during a 10-week stay, becoming the Rolling Stones' sixth UK number one. Seven days after its UK release, "Paint It Black" had sold 300,000 advance copies; the British Phonographic Industry (BPI) later certified it platinum. In 2007, the song entered the UK Singles chart at number 70 for an 11-week stint. In Germany, "Paint It Black" peaked at number two on the Musikmarkt Hit-Parade; the Bundesverband Musikindustrie (BVMI) certified the 2018 re-issue gold. The single was a top five hit in other European countries, peaking at number two in Austria, Ireland, and Norway; number three in Belgium; and number four in Spain. After its 1990 reissue, "Paint It Black" charted at number 61. The single's 2007 re-issue charted at number 49 on the Official German Charts and its 2012 re-issue charted number at 127 in France.

"Paint It Black" debuted at number 48 on the US Billboard Hot 100 chart for the week of 14 May 1966. The song took three weeks to rise to number one, where it stayed for two consecutive weeks, being replaced by Frank Sinatra's "Strangers in the Night." Its stint at number one made it the band's third in the US and the first song to feature a sitar to peak at number one in the country. By June, it had sold more than a million copies. It rose to number one in a "violent shakeup" of the list where 10 of its 20 songs appeared for the first time. "Paint It Black" remained on the chart for 11 weeks. Further re-issues of the single have not peaked on the Billboard Hot 100, but 2008 sales saw "Paint It Black" reach number 73 on the Billboard Hot Canadian Digital Song Sales. According to the pop historian Richard Havers, Aftermaths 1966 chart run in the US, where it reached number 2 on the Billboard chart and number 1 on those published by Cash Box and Record World, was assisted by the success of "Paint It Black". "Paint It Black" also topped singles charts in Canada and the Netherlands, and was ranked within the Top 10 highest performing singles of the year in Austria, despite not reaching number 1 on the weekly charts.

In a KEYS national survey taken in June 1966, "Paint It Black" was number one in the United States. Surveys conducted by the Associated Press and United Press International identified the song as ranking No. 1 in the US the week of 12–19 June 1966. On the 1966 year-end charts, "Paint It Black" ranked number 34 on the US Billboard Hot 100 and number 30 on the Record Retailer chart. The 1990 re-issue of "Paint It Black" topped the Netherlands Single Top 100 and peaked at number 11 in Belgium.

 Live performances and other versions 
The Rolling Stones performed "Paint It Black" during their tours of America and England in 1966, following its release, along with other songs from Aftermath such as "Under My Thumb" and "Lady Jane", One notable live performance of the song was as the opening song of the Stones' performance at the Royal Albert Hall, a performance remembered for ending prematurely due to a riot, which led to rock bands being banned from performing at the venue. Footage of the riot would later be used in the promotional video for the Stones' next single, "Have You Seen Your Mother Baby, Standing in the Shadow?". Despite its status as a hit single and as a staple of these shows, "Paint It Black" was not included on the Stones' live album documenting their tour of England, Got Live If You Want It!.

"Paint It Black" has become a regular fixture of the Stones' concert setlists following its release, and has been performed during the Steel Wheels/Urban Jungle Tour (1991), Licks Tour (2002–2003), A Bigger Bang Tour (2005–2007), 50 & Counting (2012–2013), 14 On Fire (2014), América Latina Olé Tour 2016, No Filter Tour (2017–2020) and Sixty tour (2022).

American funk-rock band Eric Burdon and War released a cover of the song in 1970, which reached number 31 on the Dutch Top 40 singles chart. Bahamian musician Exuma included a cover of the song on his 1973 album Life. Irish rock band U2 included a cover of "Paint It Black" as the B-side to their 1992 single "Who's Gonna Ride Your Wild Horses" and did so again with the 20th anniversary rerelease of their album Achtung Baby in 2011. The London Symphony Orchestra performed a cover of the song in their 1994 "Symphonic Music of the Rolling Stones" performance. American singer Tracy Lawrence covered "Paint It Black" for the compilation album Stone Country: Country Artists Perform the Songs of the Rolling Stones in 1997. American singer-songwriter Vanessa Carlton included a cover of the song on her 2002 debut album Be Not Nobody, which was certified platinum by the Recording Industry Association of America. Canadian rock band Rush played one minute and ten seconds of the song during their 2003 performance at Molson Canadian Rocks for Toronto. American singer-songwriter Ciara recorded a cover version for the 2015 film, The Last Witch Hunter.

The song has seen commercial use in film, video games and other entertainment media. "Paint It Black" plays during the end credits of the films Full Metal Jacket (1987) and The Devil's Advocate (1997), and was a plot device in the supernatural horror film Stir of Echoes (1999). The trailers for both the video game Call of Duty: Black Ops III (2015) and the film The Mummy (2017) feature "Paint It Black". Multiple episodes of the TV series Westworld use an orchestral arrangement of the song by Ramin Djawadi. The song is featured in Black Adam (2022), during a slow motion fight sequence. A cello arrangement of the song was featured in Wednesday (2022). The song features on the soundtracks to multiple video games, including Twisted Metal: Black (2001), Guitar Hero III: Legends of Rock (2007) and Guitar Hero Live (2015).

 Personnel 

According to authors Andy Babiuk and Greg Prevost, except where noted:The Rolling Stones Mick Jagger – lead and harmony vocals; writer
 Keith Richards – harmony vocal; lead and acoustic guitars; writer
 Brian Jones – sitar, acoustic guitar
 Bill Wyman – bass, Hammond organ, maracas, cowbell
 Charlie Watts – drums, tambourine, castanetsAdditional musicians and production Jack Nitzsche – piano
 Dave Hassinger – sound engineer
 Andrew Loog Oldham – producer

In Philippe Margotin and Jean-Michel Guesdon's book The Rolling Stones All the Songs, they add a question mark after Jones' guitar contribution and credit "tambourine, bongos, castanets" to "unidentified musicians". In the book Rolling Stones Gear by Babiuk and Prevost, they credit an acoustic guitar contribution to Jones, maracas and cowbell to Wyman and tambourine and castanets to Watts.Studio locations'

 Recorded at RCA Studios (Los Angeles)

Charts

Weekly charts

Year-end charts

Certifications

Notes

References

Bibliography 

 
 
 
 
 
 
 
 
 
 
 
 
 
 
 
 
 
 
 
 
 
 
 
 
 
 
 
 
 

1966 singles
1968 singles
1971 singles
1990 singles
The Rolling Stones songs
Decca Records singles
Liberty Records singles
London Records singles
Immediate Records singles
The Animals songs
War (American band) songs
W.A.S.P. songs
Billboard Hot 100 number-one singles
Cashbox number-one singles
Dutch Top 40 number-one singles
RPM Top Singles number-one singles
UK Singles Chart number-one singles
Songs written by Jagger–Richards
Song recordings produced by Andrew Loog Oldham
British psychedelic rock songs
Songs about death
Songs about depression
Song recordings produced by Jerry Goldstein (producer)
Raga rock songs
Versa (band) songs
The Last Witch Hunter
Chris Farlowe songs